Flight Officer William Armstrong (October 30, 1924 – April 1, 1945) was a member of the famed group of World War II-era African-Americans known as the Tuskegee Airmen. His plane was shot down on Easter Sunday in 1945 over Austria. In 2018 he was inducted into the Rhode Island Aviation Hall of Fame.

Military service

World War II 

After his graduation (September 8, 1944) from the Tuskegee Institute in Alabama he was assigned to the 301st Fighter Squadron, 332nd fighter group in Ramitelli, Italy. Armstrong flew missions escorting bombers to targets in Nazi territory.

On Easter Sunday April 1, 1945, he was among a group of Tuskegee airmen escorting bombers back to their base. The Tuskegee airmen were attacked by a group of German fighters and Amrstrong's plane was one of two American planes shot down. His body was not recovered.

Dogfight
The Tuskegee Airmen had a successful mission escorting bombers on a bombing mission over St. Polten, Austria April 1, 1945. Returning to base, the American planes were attacked by German fighter planes. The Tuskegee airmen broke away to take on the German fighter planes. The Tuskegee airmen were able to shoot down 12 of the German fighter planes, but two P-51s were shot down. Armstrong's plane crashed into the ground, his body was not recovered. Walter Manning was able to deploy his parachute but was subsequently lynched.

Recovery of his body
After the war his stepfather petitioned the military to keep searching for William Armstrong's body. The Military found his remains buried in a grave in Austria and his body was flown back to Rhode Island in 1950.

Awards
Air Medal
Purple Heart Medal
Congressional Gold Medal (2007) (posthumously)
Presidential Unit Citation
European-African-Middle Eastern Campaign Medal

Education
Central High School 1943
Tuskegee Institute (1944)

Personal life
He was born in Washington D.C. but he his mother Evelyn, and his sister Evelyn moved to Providence, Rhode Island where his grandfather lived. His mother married Nelson Venter. The city of Providence has erected a memorial to Armstrong in Providence Rhode Island at the intersection of Dodge and Cranston streets.

See also
 Executive Order 9981
 List of Tuskegee Airmen
 Military history of African Americans

Further reading
The Tuskegee Airmen: An Illustrated History, 1939–1949

References

Notes

External links
 Tuskegee Airmen at Tuskegee University
 Tuskegee Airmen Archives at the University of California, Riverside Libraries.
 Tuskegee Airmen, Inc.
 Tuskegee Airmen National Historic Site (U.S. National Park Service) 
 Tuskegee Airmen National Museum
 Fly (2009 play about the 332d Fighter Group)

1924 births
1945 deaths
People from Rhode Island
Tuskegee Airmen
Tuskegee University alumni
Military personnel from Tuskegee, Alabama
Congressional Gold Medal recipients
United States Army Air Forces personnel killed in World War II
Aviators killed by being shot down
Aviators killed in aviation accidents or incidents in Germany
United States Army Air Forces officers